Postgres-XL is a distributed relational database management system (RDBMS) software based on PostgreSQL. It aims to provide feature parity with PostgreSQL while distributing the workload over a cluster. The name "Postgres-XL" stands for "eXtensible Lattice". 

Postgres-XL is based on Postgres-XC, an earlier distributed PostgreSQL system developed by NTT Data and EnterpriseDB. In 2012, the cloud database startup StormDB adopted Postgres-XC and developed some proprietary extensions and improvements to it. In 2013, StormDB was acquired by TransLattice, and the improved software was open-sourced under the name "Postgres-XL" in 2014. Since 2015, Postgres-XL development has also been supported by 2ndQuadrant.

Postgres-XL provides cluster-wide consistent transaction snapshots via a central Global Transaction Manager (GTM) node. It requires a fast interconnect between nodes, so Postgres-XL is not suited to geographically distributed clusters. Larger queries can be split and parallelized between multiple nodes. Individual database tables can be chosen to be fully replicated across the cluster (usually for smaller tables) or sharded between separate nodes (for write scalability).

See also 
 TransLattice
 PostgreSQL

References

External links 
 

PostgreSQL
Free database management systems
Relational database management systems
Distributed data stores